Raveh may refer to:
 Raveh, Markazi
 Yehuda Raveh